Claude Tircuy de Corcelle (1 July 1768 – 21 July 1843) was a French politician. He served as a member of the Chamber of Deputies from 1819 to 1822, representing Rhône. He served again from 1828 to 1831, representing Seine, and from 1831 to 1834, representing Saône-et-Loire.

References

1768 births
1843 deaths
People from Gleizé
Politicians from Auvergne-Rhône-Alpes
Members of the Chamber of Deputies of the Bourbon Restoration
Members of the 1st Chamber of Deputies of the July Monarchy
Members of the 2nd Chamber of Deputies of the July Monarchy